Democritus meditating on the seat of the soul (Démocrite méditant sur le siège de l'âme) is a statue by Léon-Alexandre Delhomme (1841–1895), exhibited at the Paris Salon of 1868. It shows the Greek philosopher Democritus, his eyes fixed on a skull he holds in his hands. It is now exhibited in the garden of the Musée des Beaux-Arts de Lyon.

On its base is inscribed an extract from the 29th fable of La Fontaine: 
"Hippocrates in time arrived at the conclusion that he had not sought whether the heart or the head was the seat of either reason or sense in man and beast"

Notes

Bronze sculptures in France
1868 sculptures
Sculptures of the Museum of Fine Arts of Lyon
Statues in France
Skulls in art